Such Winters of Memory is an album by English saxophonist John Surman recorded in 1982 and released on the ECM label.

Reception
The Allmusic review by Michael G. Nastos awarded the album 3 stars.

Track listing
All compositions by John Surman except where noted.
 "Saturday Night" (Pierre Favre, Karin Krog, John Surman) – 6:12 
 "Sunday Morning" – 7:45 
 "My Friend" (Surman, Krog, Paul Rowlands) – 5:13 
 "Seaside Postcard 1951" – 6:21 
 "On the Wing Again" – 10:54 
 "Expressions" (John Coltrane) – 2:11 
 "Mother of Light/Persepolis" (Surman, Krog, Sri Aurobindo/Surman) – 7:05

Personnel
John Surman – soprano saxophone, baritone saxophone, bass clarinet, recorder, synthesizer, voice
Karin Krog – voice, Oberheim ring modulator, tamboura
Pierre Favre – drums

References

ECM Records albums
John Surman albums
1983 albums
Albums produced by Manfred Eicher